The Université Notre Dame d'Haïti (University Notre Dame of Haiti) is a Roman Catholic university located in Port-au-Prince, Haïti. It was founded in 1995 and is organized in five faculties.

Organization
These are the five faculties in which the university is divided into:

 Faculty of Medicine and Health Sciences
 Faculty of Economical, Social and Political Sciences
 Faculty of Administrative Sciences - Cap-Haïtien
 Faculty of Agriculture - Cayes
 Faculty of Administrative Sciences - Jacmel

External links
 University Notre Dame of Haiti Website 

Universities in Haiti
University Notre Dame of Haiti
Educational institutions established in 1995
1995 establishments in Haiti